Yury Travon Walker (born December 18, 2000) is an American football outside linebacker for the Jacksonville Jaguars of the National Football League (NFL). He played college football at Georgia, winning the 2022 National Championship with them prior to being selected first overall by the Jaguars in the 2022 NFL Draft.

Early life and college
Walker was born on December 18, 2000, in Thomaston, Georgia, and attended Upson-Lee High School. He was selected to the 2019 All-American Bowl. He committed to play college football for the Georgia Bulldogs at the University of Georgia.

Walker played in 12 games and had 15 tackles and 2.5 sacks as a freshman for the Bulldogs in 2019. As a sophomore in 2020, he played in nine games with 13 tackles, one sack and one interception. Walker started at defensive tackle as a junior and was a part of the team that won the 2022 College Football Playoff National Championship. He declared for the 2022 NFL Draft following the season.

College statistics

Professional career

Walker was selected first overall by the Jacksonville Jaguars in the 2022 NFL Draft. He signed his four-year rookie contract, worth $37.4 million fully guaranteed, on May 12, 2022. In his debut, Walker recorded a sack and interception in a 28-22 loss against the Washington Commanders. In his rookie season, he started in 14 of the 15 games he appeared in. He finished with 3.5 sacks, 49 total tackles, one interception, two passes defensed, and one forced fumble.

NFL career statistics

References

External links
 

Jacksonville Jaguars bio
Georgia Bulldogs bio

Living people
Players of American football from Georgia (U.S. state)
American football defensive tackles
American football defensive ends
American football outside linebackers
Georgia Bulldogs football players
People from Thomaston, Georgia
2000 births
Jacksonville Jaguars players
African-American players of American football